The Kimilsungia and Kimjongilia Exhibition Hall is a museum located in Pyongyang, North Korea.  It opened in July 2013. It hosts the International Kimilsungia and Kimjongilia Festivals, which is about Kimilsungia and the Kimjongilia, two flowers named after North Korean leaders Kim Il Sung and Kim Jong Il.

See also 

 List of museums in North Korea

References 

Museums in North Korea
Museums established in 2013
2013 establishments in North Korea
Buildings and structures in Pyongyang